Kampong Bukit Belalong is a village in Brunei.

Administration
Kampong Bukit Belalong is administered as a part of Amo, Temburong District.

References 

Bukit Belalong